Ganesan Subbiah (born 25 August 1969), popularly known as Susi Ganesan, is an Indian film director, producer, scriptwriter and screenwriter.

Early life
Ganesan was born on (25 August 1969) Vannivelampatti, Madurai District in Tamil Nadu to Tamil parents Subbiah and Sittamma. He changed his screen name to Susi Ganesan, his first name being from the first two letters from his parents' first names. He attended Gandhi Nikethan higher secondary school in T. Kallupatti and also graduated from Madras Institute of Technology with a bachelor's degree in automobile engineering.

During his college days, he was a journalist, writing many articles for the Tamil magazine Ananda Vikatan. He was also chairman of ATHENAEUM, the student body of the Madras Institute of Technology, during 1991–92. After working as an assistant to director Mani Ratnam during the filming of Bombay (1995), Iruvar (1997) and Dil Se.. (1998), Ganesan debuted as a director with the 2002 film Virumbugiren.

Career
His first film, Virumbugiren, was initially titled Thithikkum Thee and was to feature Murali in the lead role of a firefighter, but later Prashanth was finalized for the lead role. The project, which also marked the debut of actress Sneha, went through production troubles and released nearly two years after the launch, becoming Ganesan's second release. The film received four awards at the 2001 Tamil Nadu State Film Awards, winning the Best Director, Best Actress and Best Supporting Actress prizes, while also being adjudged as the Best Film of the year.

Ganesan then made Five Star (2002), which happened to be his first release, due to the delay of his first project Virumbugiren. Five Star, produced by his mentor Mani Ratnam under the banner Madras Talkies, featured five newcomers in the title roles. The story focused on friendship, love with social awareness and a touch of human emotions. The film won him the Tamil Nadu State Film Award for Best Storywriter. He then launched a film titled Sakkarai with Prashanth and Reemma Sen in the lead roles in October 2004, but the film was subsequently postponed then shelved.

In 2006, Ganesan made his third film Thiruttu Payale. The film, which featured Jeevan, Sonia Agarwal and Malavika in principal roles, emerged a sleeper hit and ranked among the highest-grossing Tamil films of the year. It was named the third Best Film of the year by the Tamil Nadu State Government and gave major breaks to the leading actors, with the performances of Jeevan and Malavika, in particular, being considerably appreciated. Then, Ganesan directed Kanthaswamy. The film dealt with the disparity of rich and poor in Indian society, and it was reportedly the first South Indian film in that the protagonist, portrayed by Vikram, conceived a superhero character. The film had the biggest opening in the year 2009.

Ganesan's next directed and produced the Hindi film, Shortcut Romeo (2013), a remake of his 2006 film Thiruttu Payale starring Neil Nitin Mukesh and Puja Gupta.

After a long break from the Tamil film Industry, Susi Ganesan returned with a sequel to his film Thiruttu Payale. Thiruttu Payale 2 featured Bobby Simha, Prasanna and Amala Paul in lead roles. The movie was released in Nov 2017 and made an average collection.

In 2018, Ganesan was accused by filmmaker Leena Manimekalai during the MeToo movement in India. Her accusation was supported by Amala Paul, whom Ganesan had worked with, in Thiruttu Payale 2. In response, Ganesan filed a defamation suit against Manimekalai at the Saidapet Magistrate Court.

Awards

Filmography

References

External links

People from Madurai district
Tamil film directors
Madras Institute of Technology alumni
Living people
Tamil Nadu State Film Awards winners
Indian male screenwriters
Tamil screenwriters
Tamil film producers
Film directors from Tamil Nadu
Screenwriters from Tamil Nadu
21st-century Indian film directors
21st-century Indian dramatists and playwrights
21st-century Indian male writers
1971 births
21st-century Indian screenwriters